Asar may refer to:

Asr prayer, one of the five daily prayers in Islam
Asar, Iran, a village in Iran
Asar, Düzce
Asar, Ortaköy, a village in Turkey
Asar, Yığılca
Asar Party, a former Kazakhstani political party
Advanced Synthetic Aperture Radar instrument aboard the European Space Agency's Envisat satellite
Arc Segment Attitude Reference, an on-boresight attitude reference symbol for a helmet-mounted display (HMD)
A 19th-century transcription of the name Osiris, an Ancient Egyptian deity
Esker, a glacial landform sometimes called an asar
Ashadh (Nepali calendar) or Asār, the third month in the Bikram Samvat, the official Nepali calendar